Newmains United Football Club are a Scottish football club based in the village of Newmains, near the towns of Wishaw and Motherwell.

Formed in 2006, they are the successors to Coltness United who were formed in 1934. They merged with amateur team Carluke FC in February 2018, keeping the same name

Notable players 
The club's most notable former player is Tommy Gemmell who went on to join Celtic and become part of the triumphant Lisbon Lions squad who won the European cup in 1967. Tommy led the call to arms to save the club in early 2015 when the lack of active committee members put Newmains' future in doubt. 

Other famous former players are former Scotland manager Craig Brown and ex-Celtic goalkeeper Pat Bonner. 

Brown joined Rangers from Coltness United in 1958 but failed to make a regular breakthrough into the first team and was eventually transferred to Dundee where he won the Scottish League Championship in 1962. Brown was named by the Tartan Army (Scotland Supporters Club) as 'Scotland's Greatest Ever Manager'. 

One-time Republic of Ireland No1 Bonner played his first game in Scotland for Coltness after being farmed out so Celtic could see him in action. In his autobiography The Last Line Bonner writes: "My playing introduction to Scottish football would be a tight little ground with a surprisingly large crowd that pressed hard in on you from all angles as I lined up for Coltness United against East Kilbride Thistle. "I loved that kind of environment. Red-hot atmosphere, an audience so close you could hear them breathe and every player giving it his all."This was the first time I met a tremendous man who would influence my career greatly - Frank Connor. Frank worked with the then Celtic assistant manager Dave McParland and both of them reported back to Jock Stein on individual performances..."The Coltness game had gone well and I enjoyed the whole trial." Worst player was Stevie Cusack who left team after team, came to Newmains early 80s where he stayed for 2 years never appearing , known as the bench warmer. Stevie was an honest kid but did not like the hard yards, he was a legend in his own head and if only he worked hard he could have made some cameo appearances, the clubs biggest regret was not getting him on the park at all, the only player in the club’s history this has ever happened.

Coaching staff

Manager : David Menelaws.
Ass-Manager : Tommy Morgan.
First Team Coach : Marc Fleming.
Goalkeeper Coach : Scott Brunton.

References

External links 
 Facebook
 Twitter

Football clubs in Scotland
Scottish Junior Football Association clubs
Association football clubs established in 2006
Football in North Lanarkshire
2006 establishments in Scotland
Wishaw
West of Scotland Football League teams